Ninotchka Rosca (born December 17, 1946, in the Philippines) is a Filipina feminist, author, journalist, and human rights activist. best known for her 1988 novel State of War and for her activism, especially during the Martial Law dictatorship of former Philippine President Ferdinand Marcos. Rosca has been described as "one of the major players in the saga of Filipina American writers."  

Rosca was a recipient of the American Book Award in 1993 for her novel Twice Blessed.

She is active in AF3IRM , the Mariposa Center for Change, Sisterhood is Global and the initiating committee of the Mariposa Alliance (Ma-Al), a multi-racial, multi-ethnic women's activist center for understanding the intersectionality of class, race and gender oppression, toward a more comprehensive practice of women's liberation.

Biography

Education and early career 
Rosca received a Bachelor of Arts degree in English (Comparative Literature) at the University of the Philippines, and became a journalist working for various Philippine publications after she graduated.  She was taking up Asian Studies (Khmer Civilization) for her graduate studies at the time she had to leave the Philippines because of the Marcos Dictatorship.

Imprisonment and exile during Martial Law 
Rosca was one of many Philippine journalists who became political prisoners under the dictatorial government of Ferdinand Marcos in the Philippines. She was detained for six months, and was interrogated several times before her release.  On getting out of prison, she took a job with an investment company in Manila while raising funds to help people hide from Marcos' security forces.  When she received a tip that she was about to be arrested a second time, she sought help from a cultural attache at the U.S. Embassy, who helped Rosca get out of the Philippines by getting her into an international writers program in the United States.

While in exile, Rosca was designated as one of the 12 Asian-American Women of Hope by the Bread and Roses Cultural Project. These women were chosen by scholars and community leaders for their courage, compassion, and commitment in helping to shape society. They are considered role models for young people of color, who, in the words of Gloria Steinem, "have been denied the knowledge that greatness looks like them.

In 1986 she returned to the Philippines to report on the final days of Marcos.

Later activism 
Rosca has worked with Amnesty International and the PEN American Center. Rosca was also a founder and the first national chair of the GABNet, the largest and only US-Philippines women's solidarity mass organization, which has evolved into AF3IRM. She is the international spokesperson of GABNet's Purple Rose Campaign against the trafficking of women, with an emphasis on Filipinas.

She was at the United Nations' Fourth World Conference on Women which took place in Beijing, China, and at the UN's World Conference on Human Rights in Vienna, Austria. At the latter, she drafted the Survivors Statement, signed by four Nobel Prize winners and hundreds of former prisoners of conscience. This statement first applied the phrase "modern-day slavery" to the traffic of women. It was in Vienna as well where the slogan "women's rights are human rights" gained international prominence; Rosca had brought it from the Philippine women's movement and helped launch it internationally.

Rosca was press secretary of the Hague International Women's Tribunal on Japan's World War II Military Sex Slavery which convicted Japan's wartime era leadership for creating and using the Comfort Women. Rosca is particularly concerned with the origins of women's oppression and the interface between class, race, and gender exploitation so that women can move toward greater theory building and practice of a comprehensive genuine women's liberation. She often speaks on such issues as sex tourism, trafficking, the mail-order bride industry, and violence against women, and the labor export component of globalization under imperialism.

Personal life 
She lives in the neighborhood of Jackson Heights, Queens in New York City. Her lecture schedules are managed by Speak Out Now. A huge fan of science fiction, Rosca reads four books a week (three "light," one "heavy").

Works

Novels 
Twice Blessed: A Novel (1992)
State of War (1988)

Nonfiction 
Jose Maria Sison: At Home in the World—Portrait of a Revolutionary, co-authored with Jose Maria Sison (2004)
Endgame: The Fall of Marcos non-fiction (Franklin Watts, 1987)

Story Collections
Stories of a Bitter Country (Anvil, 2019)
Gang of Five (Independently Published, 2013)
Sugar & Salt (2006)
The Monsoon Collection (Asian and Pacific Writing) (University of Queensland Press, 1983)
Bitter Country and other stories (Malaya Books, 1970)

Reception and recognition
Rosca's novel "State of War" is considered a classic account of ordinary people's  dictatorship. Her second best-selling English language novel Twice Blessed won her the 1993 American Book Award for excellence in literature.

Rosca is a classic short story writer. Her story "Epidemic" was included in the 1986 "100 Short Stories in the United States by Raymond Carver and in the Missouri Review collection of their Best Published Stories in 25 Years, while "Sugar & Salt" was included in the Ms Magazine's Best Fiction in 30 Years''.

See also
Cecilia Manguerra Brainard
Maria Rosa Luna Henson
Angela Manalang-Gloria
PAWWA
Paz Márquez-Benítez
Sophia G. Romero
Women in the Philippines
Liwayway Arceo
Lualhati Bautista

References

External links
"Lily Pad" Unconventional Thoughts from an Unconventional Filipina, a personal blogsite by Ninotchka Rosca

1946 births
Living people
Filipino activists
Filipino feminists
Filipino human rights activists
Filipino novelists
Filipino Roman Catholics
Filipino socialists
Filipino women novelists
Feminist writers
Writers from San Jose, California
People from Queens, New York
Filipino socialist feminists
University of the Philippines Diliman alumni
Women's rights in the Philippines
International Writing Program alumni
Palanca Award recipients
American Book Award winners